Hensingham is a suburb of Whitehaven and former civil parish, now in the parish of Whitehaven, in the Copeland district, in the county of Cumbria, England. The ward population taken at the 2011 census was 4,145. In 1931 the parish had a population of 2116.

Historically in Cumberland, the village is located to the south-east of Whitehaven on the A595 road, close to the Mirehouse Housing Estate and Moresby Parks. It has a Spar convenience store and several pubs – including the Distressed Sailor, the Lowther Arms and the Richmond. It is close to Whitehaven Fire Station and to three schools; Hensingham Primary School, St Benedict's Roman Catholic High School and Whitehaven Academy. In Hensingham is the West Cumberland Hospital, the first hospital built in England after the creation of the National Health Service. It was officially opened on 21 October 1964 by Queen Elizabeth, the Queen Mother. St John's Church is an evangelical Anglican church in this suburb.

Sport
Hensingham have one of the oldest rugby clubs in the country. Hensingham ARLFC are an amateur Rugby league based in Whitehaven. Founded in 1900 It wasn't until 1920 that the Club changed its allegiances to Rugby League. They now play their rugby in the National Conference League Division 3.

History 
Hensingham was formerly a chapelry in St. Bees parish, from 1866 Hensingham was a civil parish in its own right until it was abolished on 1 April 1934 and merged with Weddicar and Whitehaven.

References

External links

 Cumbria County History Trust: Hensingham (nb: provisional research only – see Talk page)
St John's Church, Hensingham

Villages in Cumbria
Former civil parishes in Cumbria
Whitehaven